Zürich–Enge Alpenquai is one of the 111 serial sites of the UNESCO World Heritage Site Prehistoric pile dwellings around the Alps, of which 56 are located in Switzerland.

Geography 

Located on the then-swampland between Limmat and Lake Zurich around Sechseläutzenplatz on small islands and peninsulas in Zürich, the settlements were set on piles to protect against occasional flooding by the Linth and Jona Rivers. Zürich–Enge Alpenquai is located on Lake Zurich lakeshore in Enge, a locality of the municipality of Zürich in the Canton of Zürich in Switzerland. The settlement comprises , and the buffer zone, including the lake area, comprises  in all.

Description 
Alpenquai in the city of Zürich is one of the most important Late Bronze Age lakeside settlements in Central Europe; its huge size and its almost uninterrupted occupation from 1050 BC to 800 BC, rich imports, and the excellent state of preservation of the layers with unique organic finds and architectural elements, mark it as a cultural heritage site of worldwide importance. In addition, the final phase dates from the transition to the Iron Age, a period otherwise rarely found.

Finds 

On the occasion of construction works, investigation conducted by probes and probing ditches occurred in 1970. Both, the upper and the lower cultural layer, were separated by an about  cm thick layer of lake marl composed of several layers of different materials. There were found pile shoes, indicators of prehistoric dwellings, at different altitudes in the cultural layers and rich bar decoration of ceramics occurred exclusively in the lower layer, while the decoration on cannelure groups was limited to the upper layer, as well as some graphite-decorated fragments.

So-called Potin lumps, of which the largest weighs , were found at Alpenquai in 1890. They consist of a large number of fused Celtic coins, which are mixed with charcoal remnants. Some of the about 18,000 coins originate from Eastern Gaul, while others are of the Zürich type, that were assigned to the local Helvetii, and date to around 100 BC. The find is so far unique, and the scientific research assumes that the melting down of the lumps was not completed, and therefore the aim was to form cultic offerings.

Protection 
As well as being part of the 56 Swiss sites of the UNESCO World Heritage Site Prehistoric pile dwellings around the Alps, the settlement is also listed in the Swiss inventory of cultural property of national and regional significance as a Class A object of national importance. This status declares it a historical site under federal protection under the Swiss Federal Act on Protection of Nature and Cultural Heritage of 1 July 1966. Under article 24, intentionally damaging such a site, or artifacts within it, is a criminal offense.

See also 
 Bürkliplatz
 Prehistoric pile dwellings around Lake Zurich

Literature 
 Peter J. Suter, Helmut Schlichtherle et al.: Pfahlbauten – Palafittes – Palafitte. Palafittes, Biel 2009. .
 Margrit Balmer: Zürich in der Spätlatène- und frühen Kaiserzeit. Vom keltischen Oppidum zum römischen Vicus Turicum. (Monographien der Kantonsarchäologie Zürich 39). Hochbaudepartement der Stadt Zürich, Stadtarchäologie. FO Print & Media AG, Zürich and Egg 2009, .
 Beat Eberschweiler: Ur- und frühgeschichtliche Verkehrswege über den Zürichsee: Erste Ergebnisse aus den Taucharchäologischen Untersuchungen beim Seedamm. In: Mitteilungen des Historischen Vereins des Kantons Schwyz, Volume 96, Schwyz 2004.

References

External links 

 
 Stadt Zürich Unterwasserarchäologie 

Prehistoric pile dwellings in Switzerland
History of Zürich
Lake Zurich
Cultural property of national significance in the canton of Zürich
Archaeological sites in Switzerland